A partial solar eclipse occurred on October 13–14, 2004. A solar eclipse occurs when the Moon passes between Earth and the Sun, thereby totally or partly obscuring the image of the Sun for a viewer on Earth. A partial solar eclipse occurs in the polar regions of the Earth when the center of the Moon's shadow misses the Earth. It was the 54th eclipse of the 124th Saros cycle, which began with a partial eclipse on March 6, 1049 and will conclude with a partial eclipse on May 11, 2347.

Images 
Animated path

Related eclipses

Eclipse season 

This is the first eclipse this season.

Second eclipse this season: 28 October 2004 Total Lunar Eclipse

Eclipses of 2004 
 A partial solar eclipse on April 19.
 A total lunar eclipse on May 4.
 A partial solar eclipse on October 14.
 A total lunar eclipse on October 28.

Saros 124

Solar eclipses 2004–2007

Metonic series

References

External links
 http://eclipse.gsfc.nasa.gov/SEplot/SEplot2001/SE2004Oct14P.GIF
 Google interactive map of the eclipse from NASA

Photos:
 Spaceweather.com eclipse gallery
 Partial Solar Eclipse on October 14, 2004, Nagoya, Aichi, Japan by Toshimi Taki
 Report (0,371 max.phase) from Khabarovsk, Russia

2004 10 14
2004 in science
2004 10 14
October 2004 events